Daniela Peštová (born 14 October 1970) is a Czech model. She was born in Teplice, Czech Republic, and was discovered by the Madison Modeling Agency's Dominique Caffin. She had plans to attend college after grammar school but after winning a modelling contest she moved to Paris to sign with Madison Modeling Agency. She moved to New York, and from there, her career took off.

Career

She has appeared on the covers of GQ, Marie Claire, Cosmopolitan, Glamour and Elle. She appeared in the Sports Illustrated Swimsuit Issue (second of Czechoslovak descent, after Paulina Porizkova) and has been modelling for the magazine for years, appearing on the cover three times, in 1995, 2000 and 2006. In addition to working with photographers on her Sports Illustrated shoots, she was the subject of Joanne Gair's inaugural body painting works as part of the Sports Illustrated Swimsuit Issue. She has modelled for L'Oréal and Victoria's Secret.

Personal life
Peštová married Tommaso Buti (former CEO of Fashion Café) in 1995, but they were divorced in 1998. The couple had a son, Yannick Fausto (b. 1996). 

She has a daughter, Ella Joy (born 21 July 2002) and a son, Paul Henry (born 2009) with her present partner, Slovak singer Pavol Habera, frontman of Slovak band TEAM. She was dubbed "The Chameleon" for continuously changing her look. She speaks Russian, English, French and Italian fluently, as well as her native Czech.

References

External links 
 
 

1970 births
Living people
Czech female models
People from Teplice
Victoria's Secret Angels